Millicent is an unincorporated community in southern Alberta within the County of Newell, located  northeast of Highway 1,  northeast of Brooks.

Localities in the County of Newell